The locomotives with operating Nos. 9–20 were locomotives of the Palatinate Railway.

Four locomotives each were manufactured by the companies Keßler of Karlsruhe, Maffei of Munich and Regnier Poncelet of Liege. Initially, the engines were equipped with a four-sided steam dome, which was omitted after the boiler was replaced. Retirement began in the 1870s and was completed in the mid-1880s.

They were equipped with Type 3 T 5 tenders. 

2-4-2 locomotives
Transport in Rhineland-Palatinate
9–20
Railway locomotives introduced in 1846
Maffei locomotives
Esslingen locomotives
Standard gauge locomotives of Germany
Passenger locomotives